The following is a timeline of the history of the city of Santiago, Cuba.

Prior to 20th century

 1514 - August: Santiago de Cuba founded by Diego Velázquez de Cuéllar.
 1518 - Roman Catholic diocese of Baracoa established.
 1522
 Capital of Cuba relocated to Santiago from Baracoa.
 Coat of arms granted.
 Santiago de Cuba Cathedral named as a cathedral by Pope Adrian VI. 
 1526 - Fire.
 1535 - Fire.
 1553 - Santiago was occupied and plundered by French corsairs.
 1603 - Sacked by English pirates.
 1607 - Capital of Cuba relocated from Santiago to Havana.
 1613 - Fire.
 1638 - Castillo de San Pedro de la Roca (fort) construction begins.
 1662 - British military force from Jamaica occupied and plundered the town.
 1722 - San Basilio el Magno seminary established.
 1741 - A British squadron from Jamaica and operated unsuccessfully against Santiago.
 1755 - Population: 15,471.
 1767 - 11 June: Earthquake.
 1774 - Population: 18,374.
 1787 - Sociedad Económica de los Amigos del País founded.
 1799 - Government slaves working at Cobre mine, Cuba were freed.
 1805 - El Amigo de los Cubanos newspaper begins publication.
 1808 - Population: 33,881.
 1823 - Teatro Coliseo (theatre) opens.
 1827 - Population: about 27,000.
 1852 - Earthquake.
 1862 -  tumba francesa group founded.
 1868 - Santa Ifigenia Cemetery established.
 1873 - The Virginius Affair.
 1898
 3 July: Battle of Santiago de Cuba fought near city.
 July: Siege of Santiago by US forces.
 El Cubano Libre newspaper in publication.
 Emilio Bacardí Moreau becomes mayor.
 1899 - Public library established.

20th century

 1902 - Population: 45,478.
 1905 - Convención Bautista de Cuba Oriental (church) founded.
 1909 - Vista Alegre Theatre built.
 1915 - Cine Aguilera (cinema) opens.
 1917 - Orientales baseball team formed.
 1919 - Population: 70,232.
 1924 - Cine Rialto (cinema) opens.
 1943 - Population: 118,266.
 1947 - University of Santiago de Cuba established.
 1953
 26 July: Moncada Barracks attacked by forces of Castro, launching the Cuban Revolution.
 Population: 163,237.
 1954 - Antonio Maceo Airport opens.
 1956 - 30 November:  (anti-Batista event) occurs.
 1957 - Anti-Batista unrest; crackdown.
 1964 - Estadio Guillermón Moncada (stadium) opens.
 1970 - Population: 277,600.
 1976 -  (garden) established.
 1977 - Avispas baseball team formed.
 1999 - Population: 441,524.

21st century

 2012
 March: Catholic pope visits Santiago.
 October: Hurricane Sandy.
 Population: 431,471.
 2014 - Population: 434,268.
 2015 - September: Catholic pope visits Santiago.

See also
 Santiago de Cuba history
 List of governors of Provincia de Santiago de Cuba
 Timelines of other cities in Cuba: Camagüey, Cienfuegos, Guantánamo, Havana, Holguín, Matanzas

References

This article incorporates information from the Spanish Wikipedia.

Bibliography

in English
 
 
 
 
 
 
 
 
  (Includes profile of Santiago)

in Spanish
  (3 volumes) (Includes chronology)
 
  (chronology)
  (fulltext)

External links

 Items related to Santiago de Cuba, various dates (via Digital Public Library of America)
 Items related to Santiago de Cuba, various dates (via Europeana)
 Digitized materials related to Santiago de Cuba in the Archivo Histórico Nacional of Spain, records of the Ministerio de Ultramar; via Portal de Archivos Españoles

Santiago de Cuba
Santiago de Cuba
Santiago de Cuba